Chapeltique is a municipality in the San Miguel department of El Salvador.

Chapeltique, a small town, is 25 minutes from San Miguel, with a population of 17,000 inhabitants.  The town has expanded rapidly within the last 15 years. It has a Catholic church that was built in 1821.

Municipalities of the San Miguel Department (El Salvador)